The Green Street Historic District is a historic district in Marion, Alabama.  It is centered on West Green Street and includes examples of American Craftsman, Greek Revival, and Federal style architecture.  It contains 33 structures, dating from the mid-1830s to the present, with 24 of them listed as contributing buildings.  It was added to the National Register of Historic Places on May 30, 1979.

The district is architecturally important for its fine collection of antebellum homes, including 12 in the transitional Federal-Greek Revival style and one early example of the Gothic Revival. One structure, the Andrew Barry Moore House is listed on the Historic American Buildings Survey. Of the remaining contributing structures, two modest Victorian homes date from the late 19th century and nine Bungalow-influenced homes date from the early 20th century.

The district is bounded on the east by downtown Marion, on the north by more recent residential structures, and on the west by rural countryside. The street which runs parallel to Green on the south contains additional architecturally significant structures, but they do not fit into the district because of their physical separation from Green Street. The clustering of homes along Green Street and the general lay of the land visually prescribe the district boundaries. Green Street forms a well-defined neighborhood district containing one- and two-story homes. The distance of the houses from the street and the size of the lots generally increases toward the western end of the district, away from town. The prominent building material is wood, being found on almost three-fourths of the structures. Six structures have brick exteriors, two have concrete block, and one stucco. The tree-lined street is the major western approach to the city, the only main artery which has been able to avoid commercialization.

The district has been categorized into five distinct groups according to the dates of construction. The most significant group is the 13 antebellum homes which comprise 39.3% of the district structures. Seven of these retain a strong degree of period character with virtually no structural changes. Of the six that have been altered, 3 were given a Victorian treatment in the late 19th century, 2 were given Bungaloid facades in the early 20th century, and one was recently altered by the enclosure of the portico and addition of a bay window. Of the remaining contributing structures, the two Victorian period homes and the nine early 20th century bungalows, are modest examples of their period styles and have been maintained very close to their original condition. The last two categories contain the nine structures which were built after 1930. 
however, intrude to a slight or moderate degree.

The Green Street Historic District, located on a half- mile stretch along the major western approach to the city of Marion, include twelve significant examples of Federal and Greek Revival style homes and an unusually early example of the Gothic Revival. In addition to being architecturally important, these structures are primary indicators of the lifestyles of the Black Belt planter class during the prosperous antebellum period. One of them, the Andrew Barry Moore House, is listed on the Historic American Buildings Survey. Interspersed among the pre-Civil War homes is a fine collection (9 structures) of early 20th century bungalows, as well as several modest recent structures. As a whole, the district depicts the ongoing attractiveness of Green Street as one of the city's most prestigious residential areas. Marion, the county seat of Perry County, is located in the fertile Black Belt Region of west central Alabama. Under the 1814 Treaty of Fort Jackson, the area was ceded to the federal government by the Creek Indians. Squatters and prospectors moved in until the land was put up for sale in 1817. A boom period began in the early 1830s, when farmers realized that the sticky soil was extraordinarily adaptable to the cultivation of cotton. Ultimately, production of that crop led the region to a position of economic importance in the antebellum years which it has never surpassed. Settled in 1817 and named the first permanent county seat in 1822, Marion soon emerged as the principal city of Perry County. With the influx of cotton planters to the area, the town's economy boomed from the late 1830s to the onset of the Civil War. Its location on a high, red clay rise provided a solid, dry ground for settlement which many planters preferred to the dampness and mud of the surrounding farmlands. Increasing educational, economic, and political opportunities attracted prominent men of many professions to the young community. Green Street, one of the city's earliest traffic arteries, was a popular building location during the pre-Civil War years, and 13 antebellum structures remain. The typical upper-middle class residence was a modest frame house with Greek Revival ornament and often a retention of Federal Period scaling. Homes such as the Italianate-detailed Magnolia Hill and the Gothic Revival Howze-Woodfin House were unusually elaborate for this area.

Early residents of the district included leaders in various professions. The Governor Andrew Barry Moore House was the home of the state's 16th chief executive. While governor, Moore issued the proclamation calling for the Alabama Secession Convention in 1861. The presiding officer of the convention, Judge William Macklin Brooks, lived in the Brooks-Bailey House. A prominent Marion merchant, Mark A. Myatt, built his home on Green Street around 1845. Magnolia Hill was built in 1847 by the wealthy landowner King Parker and sold in 1866 to Archibald John Battle, President of Judson College (one of three antebellum colleges in Marion).
The development of Green Street in the years following the Civil War reflects the changes in the economy of the Black Belt region. Virtually no construction took place during the immediate post-war years, and only two modest Victorian homes were added in the late 19th century. With the increasing prosperity in the early 20th century, a new building boom began on Green Street. The nine structures built between 1915 and 1930 are, for the most part, simple, one-story frame bungalows. They are important in depicting the popular architectural style of the period, as well as in showing the drastic changes in the lifestyles of Marion residents since the more prosperous antebellum years. Of the nine additional structures built since 1930, six retain the flavor of the earlier bungalows and blend well into the district. Three intrude, however, but they do not destroy the visual integrity of the district. The Nunnally House is similar in size and scale to the bungalows, but its style and location near the front of the lot make it intrude to a slight degree. Two structures, the Madison Tucker House and Apartment, are moderately intrusive in view of their irregular scaling, contemporary styling, and situation on the edge of the lot. In spite of these modern structures, the district retains the character of a mid-19th century residential area.

Structures in the district 
 Harris House (214 Green Street): c. 1930
 Lea–Thatcher House (302 Green Street): before 1834
 Moore–Drew House (304 Green Street): c. 1845
 Drew House (306 Green Street): c. 1930
 Myatt–Knudsen House (308 Green Street): c. 1845
 Nichols House (312 Green Street): c. 1930
 Horne House (402 Green Street): c. 1915
 Horne House (404 Green Street): c. 1890
 Victor Tubbs House (408 Green Street): c. 1920
 Brooks–Bailey House (506 Green Street): c. 1850
 Governor A. B. Moore House (508 Green Street): c. 1832
 Moore–Williams House (751 Green Street): c. 1840
 Boise Tubbs Rental House (513 Green Street): c. 1920
 Boise Tubbs House (511 Green Street): c. 1920
 Seawell House (509 Green Street): c. 1840
 Washburn House (501 Green Street): c. 1890
 Magnolia Hill (409 Green Street): 1847
 Howze–Woodfin House (405 Green Street): c. 1850
 Underwood House (309 Green Street): c. 1850
 Hudson–Crew House (307 Green Street): c. 1855
 Pope House (301 Green Street): c. 1835
 Eagle Hotel (207 Green Street): c. 1835
 Clinton House (205 Green Street): c. 1925
 Yeager House (203 Green Street): c. 1930

References

National Register of Historic Places in Perry County, Alabama
Historic districts in Perry County, Alabama
Historic districts on the National Register of Historic Places in Alabama
Marion, Alabama